The deviance information criterion (DIC) is a hierarchical modeling generalization of the Akaike information criterion (AIC). It is particularly useful in Bayesian model selection problems where the posterior distributions of the models have been obtained by Markov chain Monte Carlo (MCMC) simulation. DIC is an asymptotic approximation as the sample size becomes large, like AIC. It is only valid when the posterior distribution is approximately multivariate normal.

Definition

There are two calculations in common usage for the effective number of parameters of the model. The larger the effective number of parameters is, the easier it is for the model to fit the data, and so the deviance needs to be penalized. 

The deviance information criterion is calculated as

or equivalently as

From this latter form, the connection with AIC is more evident.

Motivation
The idea is that models with smaller DIC should be preferred to models with larger DIC. Since  will decrease as the number of parameters in a model increases, the  term compensates for this effect by favoring models with a smaller number of parameters.

An advantage of DIC over other criteria in the case of Bayesian model selection is that the DIC is easily calculated from the samples generated by a Markov chain Monte Carlo simulation. Then the DIC follows directly from these approximations. Claeskens and Hjort (2008, Ch. 3.5) show that the DIC is large-sample equivalent to the natural model-robust version of the AIC.

Assumptions
In the derivation of DIC, it is assumed that the specified parametric family of probability distributions that generate future observations encompasses the true model. This assumption does not always hold, and it is desirable to consider model assessment procedures in that scenario. 

Also, the observed data are used both to construct the posterior distribution and to evaluate the estimated models.
Therefore, DIC tends to select over-fitted models.

Extensions
Ando (2010, Ch. 8) provided a discussion of various Bayesian model selection criteria. 
To avoid the over-fitting problems of DIC,  developed Bayesian model selection criteria from a predictive view point. 
The criterion is calculated as

The first term is a measure of how well the model fits the data, while the second term is a penalty on the model complexity.

See also
 Akaike information criterion (AIC)
 Bayesian information criterion (BIC)
 Focused information criterion (FIC)
 Hannan-Quinn information criterion
 Kullback–Leibler divergence
 Jensen–Shannon divergence
 Watanabe–Akaike information criterion (WAIC)

References

 Ando, T. (2010). Bayesian Model Selection and Statistical Modeling, CRC Press. Chapter 7.

 Claeskens, G, and Hjort, N.L. (2008). Model Selection and Model Averaging, Cambridge. Section 3.5.

 van der Linde, A. (2005). "DIC in variable selection", Statistica Neerlandica, 59: 45-56. doi:10.1111/j.1467-9574.2005.00278.x

External links 
 

Bayesian statistics
Regression variable selection
Model selection